Geitvatnet is a lake in Narvik Municipality in Nordland county, Norway. The lake lies just west of the lake Søndre Bukkevatnet and the lake Langvatnet lies to the south.

See also
List of lakes in Norway

References

Ballangen
Lakes of Nordland